This is a list of destinations that Philippine Airlines and its regional subsidiary PAL Express have served , consisting of destinations across Asia, North America, and Oceania.

Philippine Airlines

Notes
: These destinations have since been operated by PAL Express.

PAL Express

See also
Filipinos in the New York metropolitan area
PAL Express
Philippine Airlines

References

Lists of airline destinations
Philippine Airlines